Big Otter is an unincorporated community in Clay County, West Virginia, United States. Big Otter is located on Big Otter Creek at the junction of Interstate 79 and West Virginia Route 16. Big Otter is part of ZIP code 25113. Its original post office with a zip code of 25020 closed in 1979.

References

External links
The Big Otter Community - Central Appalachia Empowerment Zone

Unincorporated communities in Clay County, West Virginia
Unincorporated communities in West Virginia